John Lamon is a 1975 graduate of Wroxeter High School where he was an outstanding lacrosse player. While at Wroxeter Lamon was a 3 time all Anne Arundel County selection, 2 time All-American selection, and 2 time all metro selection. He then continued his lacrosse career at the University of Maryland from 1976-1979. While at the University of Maryland, Lamon’s team appeared in the Final Four each season he was on the team. He also earned All-American honors in the 1978 and 1979 seasons, All Atlantic Coast Conference honors in 1979, and was selected as Captain of the South team in the honorable North South game in 1979. As of 2010, Lamon still remains in the top 20 all time Assists and Points for the University of Maryland.

Club career 
After his playing days at the University of Maryland, John Lamon went on to play 8 seasons of Club lacrosse where he won 3 National Championships, was an 8 time first team All Club player, 2 time National player of the year, and 4 time Hero’s Outstanding Attackman. He was later inducted into the Maryland Lacrosse Club Hall of Fame.

Professional career 
Lamon played professional indoor lacrosse for the Washington Wave from 1985-1988. He was a captain of the Wave each year he was there and the MVP of the 1988 season. He was also chosen to be a member of the 1986 US World team what went on to win the world championship.

Coaching career 
Lamon’s coaching career started in 1980 when he was hired as an Assistant Coach at North Carolina State University. He moved back to Maryland a year later where he became the Assistant Coach at The Severn School in Severna Park, Maryland for two more seasons. Lamon then spent the next 23 years coaching youth lacrosse in Anne Arundel County, where he led teams to both county and state championships. He was named one of the “re-founding” members of Elks Lacrosse in 1984. Lamon was the Offensive Coordinator of Major League Lacrosse’s Chesapeake Bayhawks from 2009 to 2014 leading them to championships in 2010, 2012, and 2013.  Lamon is currently coaching with the Annapolis Hawks Lacrosse Club.

Awards 

 Inducted to the Maryland Lacrosse Club Hall of Fame
 Inducted into the Anne Arundel County Athletic Hall of Fame
 Inducted into the US Lacrosse Chesapeake Chapter Hall of Fame
 Recipient of the Willis Bilderback Volunteer Lacrosse Award 2005
 Recipient of the Willie Gateau Youth Lacrosse Services Award 2008

Personal life 
Lamon resides in Annapolis, Maryland where he and his wife Cheryl raised their three children.

References
John A. Lamon Profile - Forbes.com
Coaches | Chesapeake Bayhawks Lacrosse
John Lamon athletic career, photos, articles, and videos | Fanbase

Living people
American lacrosse players
People from Severna Park, Maryland
Sportspeople from Annapolis, Maryland
Year of birth missing (living people)